John Heriot may refer to:

 John Heriot (footballer) (born 1940), Australian rules footballer
 John Heriot (journalist) (1760–1833), journalist and author